Taktik, formerly known as Futura PR, is a Slovenian communications management agency.

Taktik was the first Slovenian company to join IPREX. Taktik was formed in 2003 as Futura PR and renamed in 2013.

Taktik was awarded the Prizma prize for top public relations campaigns in Slovenia several times (years 2005, 2006, 2008, 2010, 2014, 2015, 2016), the latest was 2018 for three projects: "Food is not to waste programme" (client: Lidl Slovenija), "Park your excuses elsewhere!" (clients: Faculty of Security Sciences, University of Maribor, Traffic Safety Agency and the City of Ljubljana) and "Listening to tomorrow" (client: Ljubljanske mlekarne). Taktik was also awarded with IABC Gold Quill (years 2010, 2017, 2020), most recently in 2021 for the social responsibility project Speech Therapy Fairy Tales and Carniolan Honeybee (client: A1 Slovenia).

References

External links
 TAKTIK

Service companies of Slovenia
Companies based in Ljubljana
Public relations companies
Slovenian companies established in 2003
Mass media companies established in 2003